Tachyancistrocerus is an indomalayan, afrotropical and palearctic genus of potter wasps.

References

Biological pest control wasps
Potter wasps